Pino Rucher (1 January 1924 – 16 August 1996) was an Italian guitarist active in orchestral settings and in film soundtracks.

Biographical notes and musical career

Early life
Rucher started playing the guitar when his father came back from the United States in 1933 and presented him with a guitar. His parents decided that he should take private music lessons. After a few years’ study, he started playing in public in his hometown and in Naples and Bari.

American influence
The presence of American troops in the province of Foggia (and particularly in the area of Manfredonia, Rucher's hometown), between 1943 and 1946 led to Rucher joining several Allied Army's orchestras, where he came into contact with American musical atmosphere and jazz.

In 1946, Rucher entered the Carlo Vitale orchestra after coming first in a competition for the position of guitarist at Radio Bari. After the dissolution of the Vitale orchestra, Rucher went to work for Radio Milano as a member of the Carlo Zeme orchestra. In the 1950s and the early 1960s he also worked with two forerunners of Italian "swing", Pippo Barzizza and Cinico Angelini.

Angelini Orchestra
Angelini selected Rucher as a member of his orchestra, with which Rucher worked for about ten years. He participated in events including the First International Song Festival in Venice in 1955 and several San Remo Music Festivals, among which the 1957 Festival, where Claudio Villa came first with Corde della mia chitarra.

Pino Rucher collaborations
Rucher took part in many musical events and radio and television broadcasts (San Remo Music Festivals, Naples Festivals, Festival delle rose, Mostra Internazionale di Musica Leggera in Venice, Canzonissima, Gran varietà, Studio Uno) playing in a number of orchestras and, at the same time, went on cultivating his passion for American music, as can be seen from his transcriptions, with his own arrangements. He devoted himself to jazz and performed in live concerts or in studios under the direction of many conductors. The influence of American music can be noticed from his performance of Italian songs E se domani, Una zebra a pois (sung by Mina) and Amore twist (sung by Rita Pavone). He also worked for orchestra conductor and composer Elvio Monti, who asked him to play in a number of his recordings. Rucher played the guitar in L’Estasi, a composition written by Monti for Andrea Giordana and Marina Solinas.

Rucher took part in Sorella Radio, a production with the RAI orchestra. From the second half of the 1970s to December 1983, Rucher was engaged in playing in concerts as a guitarist in the RAI orchestra Ritmi moderni, which came to be known as the RAI Big Band. In 1984, owing to health problems, he stopped working for RAI, left Rome and retired.

Other activities
Rucher performed in film soundtracks from the late 1950s to the mid 1970s, with at least two hundred performances including those under the direction of orchestra conductors Luis Bacalov, Gianni Ferrio, Elvio Monti, Ennio Morricone, and Riz Ortolani.

Rucher was the first guitarist to play the electric guitar in Italian westerns, performing as "electric guitar soloist" in A Fistful of Dollars. Rucher also appears in some shots from Sanremo - La grande sfida, a 1960 movie including scenes from the San Remo Music Festival.  During his career he took part in musicals including Alleluja brava gente and his guitar ideas are present in numerous Italian songs, including Casetta in Canadà (sung by Carla Boni), Flamenco Rock (Milva), Se non ci fossi tu (Mina), Andavo a cento all’ora (Gianni Morandi), Che m’importa del mondo (Rita Pavone), L’edera (Nilla Pizzi) and Adesso no (Neil Sedaka).

Rucher played not only the electric guitar, but also the folk (or acoustic), the classical, the bass and the twelve-string guitar, and then the banjo, the mandolin and the double bass.

Awards
 The Municipal Authority of Manfredonia dedicated a street to Rucher.
  On 5 October 2008, the local authorities supported a commemorative event to Rucher in his home town. The event took place in Piazza Giovanni XXIII (Manfredonia's central square).

 On 16 October 2010, the Municipal Authorities of Manfredonia and of San Nicandro Garganico dedicated a special evening to Rucher. The event took place at the Cine-Teatro Italia of San Nicandro Garganico.

The main songs with Pino Rucher as electric guitarist
The main songs with Pino Rucher as electric guitarist:

 1953 - No pierrot sung by Achille Togliani 
 1953 - Viale d'autunno sung by Carla Boni 
 1953 - Buonasera sung by Carla Boni
 1953 - Duska sung by Nilla Pizzi 
 1956 - Musetto sung by Domenico Modugno
 1956 - Io, mammeta e tu sung by Domenico Modugno
 1956 - Guaglione sung by Claudio Villa 
 1957 - Corde della mia chitarra sung by Claudio Villa 
 1957 - Cancello tra le rose sung by Claudio Villa 
 1957 - Il pericolo numero uno sung by Claudio Villa and Gino Latilla
 1957 - Un filo di speranza sung by Claudio Villa
 1957 - La più bella canzone del mondo sung by Claudio Villa
 1957 - Scusami sung by Gino Latilla
 1957 - Casetta in Canadà sung by Carla Boni with the Fasano Duo and Gino Latilla
 1957 - Le trote blu sung by Carla Boni and the Fasano Duo 
 1957 - Un sogno di cristallo sung by Carla Boni
 1957 - Un certo sorriso sung by Gianni Ravera
 1957 - Serenatella sciuè sciuè sung by Gino Latilla and Carla Boni
 1958 - L'edera sung by Nilla Pizzi
 1959 - Un pizzico di musica sung by Carla Boni and Gino Latilla
 1959 - Le rififì sung by Milva Biolcati 
 1959 - Vivrò sung by Milva Biolcati 
 1959 - Nel blu dipinto di blu sung by Milva Biolcati 
 1959 - Due croci sung by Milva Biolcati
 1960 - Senza il tuo amore sung by Milva 
 1960 - Crudele tango sung by Milva and Walter Romano
 1960 - Flamenco rock sung by Milva 
 1960 - Da sola a sola sung by Milva 
 1960 - Una zebra a pois sung by Mina 
 1960 - Mi vuoi lasciar sung by Mina 
 1960 - Non voglio cioccolata sung by Mina
 1960 - Tessi tessi sung by Mina
 1961 - Mafia sung by Domenico Modugno 
 1961 - Legata ad un granello di sabbia sung by Nico Fidenco
 1961 - Come nasce un amore sung by Nico Fidenco
 1962 - Aspettandoti sung by Tonina Torrielli
 1962 - La partita di pallone sung by Rita Pavone
 1962 - Amore twist sung by Rita Pavone
 1962 - Andavo a cento all'ora sung by Gianni Morandi 
 1962 - Loredana sung by Gianni Morandi
 1962 - Go-kart twist sung by Gianni Morandi 
 1963 - Adesso no sung by Neil Sedaka
 1963 - Goccia di mare sung by Nico Fidenco
 1964 - Questi vent'anni miei sung by Catherine Spaak
 1964 - Penso a te sung by Catherine Spaak
 1964 - Che mi importa del mondo sung by Rita Pavone 
 1964 - Viva la pappa col pomodoro sung by Rita Pavone 
 1964 - Datemi un martello sung by Rita Pavone 
 1964 - E se domani sung by Mina
 1965 - Rimpiangerai, rimpiangerai sung by Gino Paoli
 1965 - Piangerò sung by Nicola Di Bari
 1965 - Gioia mia sung by Tony Cucchiara
 1966 - Se non ci fossi tu sung by Mina 
 1966 - Non ho dormito mai sung by Paolo Bracci 
 1967 - Che vuole questa musica stasera sung by Peppino Gagliardi
 1970 - Pensando a cosa sei sung by Peppino Gagliardi 
 1971 - Love story sung by Peppino Gagliardi 
 1971 - Maga maghella sung by Raffaella Carrà 
 1978 - Il trenino sung by Christian De Sica (tune of the television broadcast of the same name)

Soundtracks
The main soundtracks with Pino Rucher as electric guitarist:

 1958 - Poveri milionari - Music: Armando Trovajoli
 1959 - La grande guerra - Music: Nino Rota
 1960 - Caravan petrol - Music: Piero Umiliani
 1960 - La dolce vita - Music: Nino Rota
 1960 - Via Margutta - Music: Piero Piccioni
 1960 - Le signore - Music: Michele Cozzoli - Musical direction: Pierluigi Urbini
 1960 - I dolci inganni - Music: Piero Piccioni
 1961 - Kanjut Sar - La montagna che ha in vetta un lago - Music: Gino Marinuzzi jr.
 1961 - A porte chiuse - Music: Piero Umiliani
 1961 - Io amo, tu ami... - Music: Carlo Savina
 1961 - Un giorno da leoni - Music: Carlo Rustichelli - Musical direction: Pierluigi Urbini - Tema partigiani
 1961 - Il giudizio universale - Music: Alessandro Cicognini - Musical direction: Franco Ferrara
 1962 - Boccaccio '70 - Music: Piero Umiliani (episode: Renzo e Luciana), Nino Rota (episode: Le tentazioni del dottor Antonio), Nino Rota (episode: Il lavoro)
 1962 - Ti-Koyo e il suo pescecane - Music: Francesco De Masi - Noa-Noa - La pioggia - La laguna magica
 1962 - La spada del Cid - Music: Carlo Savina
 1962 - L'amore difficile - Music: Piero Umiliani
 1963 - La donna nel mondo - Music: Nino Oliviero, Riz Ortolani - Orchestration and musical direction: Riz Ortolani
 1963 - 8½ - Music: Nino Rota - L’illusionista
 1963 - Ro.Go.Pa.G., episode: La ricotta - Music: Carlo Rustichelli
 1963 - La vita provvisoria - Music: Carlo Savina
 1963 - La parmigiana - Music: Piero Piccioni
 1963 - Tutto il bello dell’uomo - Music: Piero Umiliani
 1963 - Tutto è musica - Music: Domenico Modugno - Musical arrangements and Musical direction: Ennio Morricone
 1963 - Totò sexy - Music: Armando Trovajoli
 1963 - Il boom - Music: Piero Piccioni - The main theme
 1963 - I 4 tassisti - Music: Fiorenzo Carpi - Musical direction: Bruno Nicolai
 1963 - La calda vita - Music: Carlo Rustichelli - Musical direction: Pierluigi Urbini
 1964 - E... la donna creò l'uomo - Music: Ennio Morricone
 1964 - I malamondo - Music: Ennio Morricone
 1964 - Il giornalino di Gian Burrasca - Music: Nino Rota - Musical arrangements and musical direction: Luis Enriquez Bacalov - Viva la pappa col pomodoro
 1964 - Per un pugno di dollari - Music: Ennio Morricone - Titoli (electric guitar soloist)
 1964 - Un mostro e mezzo - Music: Franco Mannino
 1965 - I tre volti - Music: Piero Piccioni
 1965 - La congiuntura - Music: Luis Enriquez Bacalov
 1965 - Per un pugno nell'occhio - Music: Francesco De Masi - The Ciccio and Franco ballad
 1965 - Non son degno di te - Music: Ennio Morricone
 1965 - Una moglie americana - Music: Nino Oliviero - Musical direction: Pierluigi Urbini
 1965 - E venne un uomo - Music: Franco Potenza
 1965 - Una pistola per Ringo - Music: Ennio Morricone - Una pistola per Ringo (electric guitar soloist) - Angel face (electric guitar soloist)
 1965 - Altissima pressione - Music: Ennio Morricone, Luis Enriquez Bacalov
 1965 - Agente S03 operazione Atlantide - Music: Teo Usuelli - Relaxing swing - Relaxing shake - S03 blues (alternative version)
 1965 - Gli amanti latini - Music: Carlo Savina - The shower scene at the beginning of the movie
 1965 - Giulietta degli spiriti - Music: Nino Rota
 1965 - Il compagno Don Camillo - Music: Alessandro Cicognini - Giovane amore
 1965 - 100.000 dollari per Ringo - Music: Bruno Nicolai
 1965 - Thrilling (Third episode: L’autostrada del sole) - Music: Ennio Morricone - Scene: Sylva Koscina at the table with Alberto Sordi
 1965 - Idoli controluce - Music: Ennio Morricone
 1965 - Per qualche dollaro in più - Music: Ennio Morricone - Per qualche dollaro in più (electric guitar soloist) - Il vizio d’uccidere (electric guitar soloist)
 1965 - Due marines e un generale - Music: Piero Umiliani
 1965 - Made in Italy - Music: Carlo Rustichelli
 1965 - Adiós gringo - Music: Benedetto Ghiglia - Adios (the guitars and harmonicas version)
 1966 - Avventure di mare e di costa - Music: Franco Potenza
 1966 - Mi vedrai tornare - Music: Ennio Morricone
 1966 - Sette dollari sul rosso - Music: Francesco De Masi
 1966 - Io, io, io... e gli altri - Music: Carlo Rustichelli - Cocktail - Attesa al bar
 1966 - The Texican - Music: Nico Fidenco - Musical direction: Robby Poitevin
 1966 - Fumo di Londra - Music: Piero Piccioni - Musical direction: Bruno Nicolai - Drag beat - Drag beat (alternate)	
 1966 - L’affare Beckett - Music: Nora Orlandi
 1966 - Una rosa per tutti - Music: Luis Enriquez Bacalov
 1966 - Arizona Colt - Music: Francesco De Masi - The Arizona theme
 1966 - La battaglia dei Mods - Music: Robby Poitevin
 1966 - E’ mezzanotte, butta giù il cadavere - Music: Gino Peguri
 1966 - Texas addio - Music: Antón García Abril
 1966 - Django - Music: Luis Enriquez Bacalov
 1966 - Sugar Colt - Music: Luis Enriquez Bacalov
 1966 - 1000 dollari sul nero - Music: Michele Lacerenza - Musical direction: Luigi Zito - Inseguimento - Attimi d’amore
 1966 - Navajo Joe - Music: Ennio Morricone 
 1966 - Il buono, il brutto, il cattivo - Music: Ennio Morricone - Titoli (electric guitar soloist)
 1966 - 3 pistole contro Cesare - Music: Marcello Giombini
 1966 - Ringo, il volto della vendetta - Music: Francesco De Masi
 1967 - Se sei vivo spara - Music: Ivan Vandor
 1967 - ...E divenne il più spietato bandito del sud - Music: Gianni Ferrio - Billy
 1967 - 7 Winchester per un massacro - Music: Francesco De Masi 
 1967 - I giorni dell'ira - Music: Riz Ortolani
 1967 - Le due facce del dollaro -  Giosy Capuano, Mario Capuano
 1968 - Straniero... fatti il segno della croce! - Music: Marcello Gigante - Musical direction: Carlo Esposito
 1968 - Eva la venere selvaggia - Music: Roberto Pregadio - Jungle shake - Eva’s beguine 
 1968 - E intorno a lui fu morte - Music: Carlo Savina
 1968 - Top Sensation - Music: Sante Romitelli - Musical direction: Luigi Zito - Scene in which Beba is taken in
 1969 - Metti, una sera a cena - Music: Ennio Morricone
 1969 - Femina ridens - Music: Stelvio Cipriani - Love symbol
 1969 - Kommissar X – Drei goldene Schlangen - Music: Roberto Pregadio 
 1969 - Kidnapping! Paga o uccidiamo tuo figlio - Music: Michele Lacerenza
 1969 - L’isola delle svedesi - Music: Roberto Pregadio
 1969 - Una su 13 - Music: Stelvio Cipriani, Carlo Rustichelli
 1970 - The Underground (Il clandestino) - Music: Roberto Pregadio
 1970 - Franco e Ciccio sul sentiero di guerra - Music: Roberto Pregadio - Marcia indiana - Prega Dio
 1970 - Deserto di fuoco - Music: Franco Bixio, Roberto Pregadio
 1971 - Testa t'ammazzo, croce... sei morto... Mi chiamano Alleluja - Music: Stelvio Cipriani - La verde prateria
 1971 - I diabolici convegni - Music: Carlo Savina
 1971 - Questo sporco mondo meraviglioso - Music: Piero Umiliani
 1971 - Lo chiamavano King - Music: Luis Enriquez Bacalov
 1971 - Mazzabubù... Quante corna stanno quaggiù? - Music: Roberto Pregadio
 1972 - La gatta in calore - Music: Gianfranco Plenizio - Grigioperla
 1972 - Alleluja e Sartana figli di... Dio -  Music: Elvio Monti, Franco Zauli
 1972 - Come fu che Masuccio Salernitano, fuggendo con le brache in mano, riuscì a conservarlo sano - Music: Roberto Pregadio
 1973 - Servo suo - Music: Carlo Esposito

Bibliographical notes
 d.a., Manfredonia: "La nemica" di Niccodemi al Teatro Pesante, in La Capitanata (Foggia), II (1945), n° 27 (28 October), p. 4
 Musica jazz stasera all'Unione, in La Gazzetta del Mezzogiorno (Bari), 17 November 1951, p. 4
 l.m., Jazz e blues alla Sala Unione, in La Gazzetta del Mezzogiorno (Bari), 18 November 1951, p. 4
 Artisti pugliesi: Il chitarrista Pino Ruker, in Roma (Napoli), 27 March 1958, p. 4 (Cronache delle Puglie)
 Mario , Giuseppe Rucher, in Lira musicale di Manfredonia: Musicisti del passato e del presente, Frascati, Tip. Laziale, [1966], p. 67
 Carlo , Mario , Rucher Giuseppe (Pino), in Dizionario chitarristico italiano, Ancona, Edizioni musicali Bèrben, 1968, p. 63
 Al Teatro Giordano: Domani prosa stasera jazz, in La Gazzetta del Mezzogiorno (Bari), 9 November 1969, p. 19
 Vittorio , Jazz della Rai (prima volta) esce dal Palazzo con tante «star», in Corriere della Sera, 28 January 1980, p. 9
 Alla radio questa settimana, in Radiocorriere TV (Roma), LVII (1980), n° 13 (March), p. 61
 Michele , Profilo di un musicista: Il chitarrista Pino Rucher, in il Sipontiere (Manfredonia), III (1986), n° 2 (April–June), p. 3
 Michele , Manfredonia: Le intitolazioni a 14 concittadini simbolo: Vie e nuovi nomi nel quartiere «Algesiro-Gozzini», in La Gazzetta del Mezzogiorno (Bari), 15 December 2005, p. 11
 Maurizio , C'era una volta la RCA, Roma, Coniglio Editore, 2007, [Pino Rucher mentioned among RCA guitarists on p. 299]
 Carlo , L'orchestra Angelini trasmise per radio musiche composte a Faenza, in Faenza... la città, Faenza, Tip. Faentina, 2008, p. 103
 Francesco , Pino Rucher, con la sua chitarra wawa dalla trilogia del dollaro alla Carrà..., in l'Attacco (Foggia), 3 October 2008, p. 19
 Michele , Omaggio a Pino Rucher grande chitarrista scomparso, in il Provinciale (Foggia), XX (2008), n° 10 (October), p. 3
 Maurizio , Pino Rucher, in Dizionario Biografico di Capitanata: 1900-2008, Foggia, Edizioni Agorà, 2009, pp. 252–3
 Fernando , Pino Rucher, in Raro!. Mensile di collezionismo, cultura musicale e cinema (Roma), XXI (2010), n° 217 (January), pp. 42–45
 a.m.v., Il ricordo del chitarrista Pino Rucher, in La Gazzetta di Capitanata - La Gazzetta del Mezzogiorno, 8 January 2010, p. 10
 Adriano , Il jazz in Italia: dallo swing agli anni sessanta, vol. II, Torino, EDT, 2010, [Pino Rucher mentioned on pp. 321, 348, 458]
 Anna Lucia , La musica rende omaggio alla chitarra dei «western», in La Gazzetta di Capitanata - La Gazzetta del Mezzogiorno, 11 October 2010, p. 1
 Anna Lucia , L'omaggio alla chitarra dei «western», in La Gazzetta di Capitanata - La Gazzetta del Mezzogiorno, 11 October 2010, p. 11
 Dario , Ciao Pregadio, maestro di musica e di vita, in Il Tempo (Roma) - Edizione Abruzzo e Molise, 16 November 2010, p. 54
 Lucia , Manfredonia ingrata dimentica Pino Rucher, il chitarrista di Sergio Leone, in l'Attacco (Foggia), 27 September 2011, p. 16
 Mario , Le Bon, la Brute et le Truand - Coups de feu dans la Sierra Leone (2 partie), in Séquences. La revue de cinéma (Haute-Ville, Québec, Canada), LIX (2014), n° 291 (January–August), pp. 26–27 [Pino Rucher mentioned on p. 27]
 Federico , Cicognini, Rota, Lavagnino, Savina, Trovajoli: tecniche di post-produzione a confronto, in Musica/Tecnologia (Firenze), n° 8-9 (2014-2015), pp. 39–55 [Pino Rucher mentioned on p. 46]
 Germano , Voci dal lontano West italiano, in Raropiù. Mensile di cultura musicale, collezionismo e cinema (Roma), III (2015), n° 29 (November), p. 51 [Pino Rucher mentioned on p. 51]
 Ulrich , Thrown into a Cruel World: Neil Young's Dead Man (1995), in All by Myself: Essays on the Single-Artist Rock Album, edited by Steve Hamelman, Lanham, Maryland, Rowman & Littlefield, 2016, [Pino Rucher mentioned on p. 144]
 FORUM: IL VILLAGGIO SOTTO LA BASILICA, in VINILE (Cernusco sul Naviglio), n° 7 (April-May 2017), [Pino Rucher mentioned on p. 83]
 Mariantonietta , Pino Rucher, il musicista manfredoniano che suonò con Luis Bacalov, in ManfredoniaNews.it (Manfredonia), VIII (2017), n° 23 (December), p. 3
 Giovanni , Ennio Morricone e quel legame con il manfredoniano Pino Rucher, in ManfredoniaNews.it (Manfredonia), XI (2020), n° 14 (July), p. 3
 Julian , THE SABRES OF PARADISE: HAUNTED DANCEHALL (WARP,1994), in Prog (London), n° 113 (October 2020), p. 20
 Giovanni , Pino Rucher nel ricordo del grande Gigi Proietti, in ManfredoniaNews.it (Manfredonia), XI (2020), n° 21 (November), p. 3
 IL RICORDO: Quando Lina Wertmüller parlò del musicista manfredoniano Pino Rucher: “Era un ottimo chitarrista”, in l'Attacco (Foggia), 14 December 2021, p. 24

References

External links

 

1924 births
1996 deaths
Italian guitarists
Italian male guitarists
Italian jazz musicians
Italian jazz guitarists
20th-century Italian musicians
20th-century guitarists
People from Manfredonia
20th-century Italian male musicians